Rida Saïd Al-Aytouni (Arabic: رضا سعيد الأيتوني) (1876–1945), a Syrian doctor from Damascus was an eye surgeon, an ophthalmologist, and the leading educational reformer of early 20th century Syria. After World War I he created the Arab Medical School in Damascus, becoming its first Dean and linking it to the National Hospital.  Under The French mandate, Dr Rida Saïd founded the University of Damascus in 1923, becoming its first President.

He continued his medical practice as an ophthalmologist all his life.  After serving as Minister of Education and as President of Damascus University his ground-breaking reforms caused him to be widely known as “the founder of modern education in Syria”.  His son, Wafic Saïd, is an international businessman and philanthropist.

Biography 
Born in Damascus in 1876 to a well off family, Rida Saïd’s primary and secondary education was at Rashidiya Military School in Damascus.  He continued his education at the Military Medical School in Istanbul where after graduating in 1902 and was appointed assistant to the Professor of Ophthalmology.  He was then promoted to Head of Medical Ward in 1908 with the rank of Agassi, or "Major" in the army of the Ottoman Empire.

In 1909, he was sent to Hotel Dieu Hospital in Paris where he studied for his degree under the famous eye surgeon Professor Félix de Lapersonne who was head of the Department of Ophthalmology.

After being awarded with a degree and winning a research fellowship as a  “Moniteur” Dr Rida Saïd’s abilities were regarded as so exceptional that Professor Félix de Lapersonne  appointed him to be his Principal Assistant in all his eye surgery operations.

He returned to Damascus in 1913, and started practicing as an Ophthalmologist, though at the time it was called “Kahala”.  A year after his return, he served as Chief Medical Officer for the Hijazi Railway and soon after appointed Director of the Syrian Railways. In 1917 he was elected as Mayor of Damascus during a period of significant and historical world events such as the First World War which began in 1914 in addition to the beginning of the Arab Renaissance, which had been expanding and gaining traction since the beginning of the last century.  During the period Dr Saïd served as Mayor, Damascus suffered a great famine lasting many years and as Mayor worked hard to ease the suffering of the people.

After King Faisal took office in Syria Dr Said met with the King in Aleppo and endeavoured to convince him to reopen all scientific institutes closed because of the war.  This was agreed and In 1919, he was able to establish the first medical school in Damascus and the world that teaches in Arabic which in 1920 became known the Arab Medical Institute to which he was elected dean.

Contribution to Syrian Education 
Dr Saïd launched new medical departments at the institute, including a department for the study of nursing and midwifery; with further departments established soon after for pharmacy and dentistry, thus creating the building blocks of an Academic School in Damascus. He also presented to students and specialists, a translation from a French book entitled Research in Ophthalmology for Trainees - one of the most important references of Ophthalmology at the time.  In addition to this, he continued to push the teaching team to "arabise" medical terms. Most importantly, Dr Saïd succeeded in persuading the French occupation authorities not to close the Institute and began to work on its expansion, defying the difficult political, economic and military conditions of the occupation.

He succeeded in establishing the Damascus University in 1923 and became its first President.  He worked on the qualification of its scientific and administrative staff and opened the way to the establishment of the Institute of Law, becoming the first academic law school department in the Middle East. The University persisted in teaching in Arabic, despite academic and political difficulties, thus making it the first and only university in the world to study science in Arabic.

Arabization of the Institute of Medicine in Damascus 
After the end of the First World War and the withdrawal of the Ottoman forces from Damascus, an Arab government was formed headed by Prince Faisal bin Al Hussein, son of Sharif Hussein bin Ali, the leader of the Great Arab Revolt against the Ottomans. The prince met with a delegation of Syrian doctors, who asked him to reopen the Ottoman Medical Institute in the Baramkeh neighborhood, which had been closed due to the circumstances of the war. Faisal accepted their request and ordered the institute to reopen on January 23, 1919, after its name changed to become the Institute of Arab Medicine. A small committee of prominent doctors was formed, with the aim of Arabizing curricula and converting them from the Turkish language into Arabic. Rida Saïd chaired this committee, which included Abdul Rahman Al Shahbandar, a graduate of the American University of Beirut, Dr. Ahmed Munif Al-Aidi, a graduate of the Ottoman Medical Institute in Istanbul, Dr. Murshed Khater, a graduate of the Jesuit University of Beirut, Dr. Abdel Qader Zahra, one of Sharif Hussein's physicians, and Dr. Mahmoud Hammouda, one of the prominent Damascene doctors in the Hijaz.

Dean of the Arab Medical Institute 
Rida Saïd was appointed Dean of the Institute of Arab Medicine and assigned the Palestinian jurist Abdul Latif Salah to the Deanship of the Institute of Law, which opened its doors to Syrian students in September 1919, that is, a year after the Ottoman forces had evacuated from Damascus. On the day he assumed the deanship, Dr. Rida Saïd searched for local doctors to fill the gap in the educational staff, given the travel of all Turkish doctors, so Dr. Mustafa Shawky (who later became the dean of the Faculty of Medicine) came and appointed him as a teacher of histology and anatomy, and he assigned his friend Dr. Ahmed Munif Al-Aidi to teach pediatrics and physiology. The pathology course was assigned to Murshid Khater. As for Dr. Sami Al-Satti (who also became the dean of the faculty after years), he taught internal medicine, and Dr. Ibrahim Al-Satti became a specialist in gynecology, and Dr. Jamil Al-Khani, a graduate of the Ottoman Medical Institute, taught dermatology, at the time that Professor Abdel-Wahab worked Channels and Shawkat surgeon on the advancement of the Department of Chemistry. Dr. Michel Shamandi taught herbal medicine, and Dr. Ahmed Hamdi Al-Khayyat, a graduate of the French Louis Pasteur Institute, taught microbiology.

Minister of Education and President of Damascus University 
In 1924, Dr Saïd took over the Ministry of Education in the first Syrian government, formed under the French mandate by President Sobhi Barakat but he resigned after the beginning of the great Syrian revolution. In 1925, Dr Saïd returned to his position as President of the University, and continued his efforts to gain recognition of the Syrian secondary certificate (which was eventually recognised in 1929) as well as the French baccalaureate as a condition of entry to the university.  His great ambition was to strengthen and raise the level of the Syrian University, especially in the field of medicine, to compete with the French and American medical institutes in Beirut.

In 1936, Dr Saïd requested from the first President of the Republic, Mohammed Al-Abed, to approve his retirement from the presidency of the university.  This resulted in the President issuing a presidential decree.

During his life and career he was awarded many honours and medals including the Ottoman Order of Merit. the Majidi Medal, the Ottoman War Medal, the Iron Crown Medal from the Government of Austria, the Paris Medal in the French Legion of Honour and the Commandor Medal, the Egyptian Medal of Knowledge, the Red Cross Medal and the Syrian Order of Excellence.

Rida Saïd Conference Centre 
The building dates to 1318 AH / 1900 AD. It was built in the Ottoman era and was called, during the French mandate, the National Hospital, or the Foreigners Hospital. It is built of stone and brick and its geometric architectural plan is in a U-shape. The building was rehabilitated, and a central block (multi-use hall) was added during the restoration on the entire space surrounding the building at the expense of Dr Saïd's son Mr. Wafic Saïd and great care was taken to preserve the old historical shape of the building.  In honour of his memory, the centre bore the name of Mr Wafic Said’s father, Dr Rida Saïd, founder of the Syrian University. 

Damascus University Gardens

The total surface area of ​​all floors after renovation became 3960 m2 and 3440 m2 for the main central part of the site. The building has three entrances, the first from the road adjacent to the Sulaymaniyah Hospital (the Military Museum) and the other two from inside the campus of Damascus University.  The building contains many original paintings of different sizes. It also contains excellent examples of European furniture and Syrian handicrafts made of wood and shells. The main entrance to the building is decorated with a semi-circular water body divided into two parts on either side of the entrance. The general site of the building contains perennial and young trees

University Dean's Office

This centre is considered one of the most recent landmarks at Damascus University, representing the modern face of Syrian architecture while maintaining its historical heritage and its ancient and modern features but also including the latest technology for its patrons - both Arabic and non-Arabic.

The building was equipped as a conference centre and the main hall (the multi-use hall)  was equipped with the latest audio and video systems.  The facilities also offer simultaneous translation of different languages at the same time.  This hall can accommodate up to 400 people. The centre also contains a theatre hall that can accommodate 118 people, equipped with full audio and video facilities. In addition, there are 4 auxiliary meeting rooms in the centre, each of which can accommodate 16 to 25 people, depending on the method of use, and is used for sub-committees that may arise from any conferences. As for the first floor, it contains, in addition to the offices of the President of Damascus University, the main hall, which is a very large meeting room that can accommodate about 35 people.

Death 
Dr Rida Saïd died on 28 October 1945 in Damascus and was buried there.  Syria bid farewell to a scientific and patriotic figure, who earned enormous respect for his great achievements including his efforts to establish the Syrian University.  Years later the Syrian University placed his name on the main street adjacent to Damascus University in the centre of the capital.

His son is the international businessman and Philanthropist Wafic Saïd.

Decorations 

 Ottoman Order of Merit
 The Medal Majidi, the Ottoman War Medal
 Iron Crown Medal from the Government of Austria
 Medal of Paris in the French Legion of Honor
 Commander Medal
 Egyptian Knowledge Medal
 Red Cross Medal
 The Syrian Order of Merit, of the excellent class

References 

People from Damascus
Syrian ophthalmologists
Syrian educators
1876 births
1946 deaths